General Manteuffel may refer to:

Edwin Freiherr von Manteuffel (1809–1885), Prussian general during the Franco-Prussian War
Hasso von Manteuffel (1897–1978), German general during World War II
 Heinrich von Manteuffel (1696–1798), Prussian lieutenant general in Wars of Frederick the Great